Joseph Charles Scott (July 28, 1908 – June 23, 2002) was a businessman and a founding partner of the NHL's Philadelphia Flyers. Philadelphia won two Stanley Cups with Scott as President in 1974 and 1975.

References

External links
Flyers Hall Of Fame Profile
Flyers Alumni - Joe Scott

1908 births
2002 deaths
Baseball players from Pennsylvania
National Hockey League executives
Businesspeople from Philadelphia
Philadelphia Flyers executives
Philadelphia Flyers owners
Stanley Cup champions
20th-century American businesspeople